William de Brit was Sheriff of Connacht until his death at the battle of Termon MacGrath in 1247.

References

Knox, Robert Thomas. The History of the County of Mayo to the Close of the Sixteenth Century. With illustrations and three maps. (Originally published c.1890. Castlebourke, De Burca 2000.

External links
http://www.ucc.ie/celt/published/G100011/index.html

13th-century births
1247 deaths
Brit, William de
People from County Galway